Maynard is a masculine given name. Notable people with the name include:

 Maynard (Australian media personality), DJ with ABC in Australia
 Maynard Ferguson (1928–2006), Canadian jazz trumpeter
 Maynard Jackson (1938–2003), former mayor of Atlanta, Georgia
 Maynard James Keenan (born 1964), singer for the bands Tool, A Perfect Circle and Puscifer (born James Herbert Keenan)
 John Maynard Keynes (1883–1946), English economist
 Maynard C. Krueger (1906–1991), socialist professor and politician
 Maynard Lyndon (1907-1999), American architect
 Maynard Jack Ramsay (1914–2005), American entomologist
 Maynard Reece (1920–2020), American artist
 Maynard Harrison Smith (1911–1984), US recipient of the Medal of Honor
 Maynard Solomon (1930-2020), American music producer and musicologist
 Maynard Wallace (1943-2021), American politician
 Maynard Webb Chairman of the Board of Directors at Yahoo!
 Robert Maynard Jones (Bobi Jones; 1929-2017), Welsh poet and academic

Fictional characters:
 Maynard G. Krebs, character from The Many Loves of Dobie Gillis
 Maynard James "M.J." Delfino, fictional character from the television show Desperate Housewives, played by Mason Vale Cotton
 Maynard, one of the main antagonists from Pulp Fiction (film)
 Brother Maynard, from Monty Python and the Holy Grail

See also
 Mainard
 Meinhard (disambiguation)
 Meinhardt

Germanic masculine given names